Kharbechgan (also Romanized as Khārbechgān; also known as Khārbejgān) is a village in Rahdar Rural District, in the Central District of Rudan County, Hormozgan Province, Iran. At the 2006 census, its population was 82, in 22 families.

References 

Populated places in Rudan County